Nather Jarrar (born 28 August 1982) is a  professional football coach and former player who  was coach at academy Whitecaps FC and Currently the Men's team coach with Al-Faisaly

Playing career 
Jarrar started his career at Al-Hussein in 1999, before deciding to concentrate on his studies in Canada. He returned to Jordan on 9 January 2006, signing for Al-Wehdat. Jarrar then moved back Canada, playing for Lakeshore SC and Concordia Stingers, before returning to Jordan in 2007 at Al-Ahli. He joined Al-Baqa'a in 2009.

Managerial career 
Nather is the founder of football club Amman FC In Jordan. He acquired his UEFA C license in Reading with The Football Association in 2010, the UEFA B License in 2013, and the UEFA A License in 2017 with the Football Association of Ireland in Dublin.

Nather worked at the Villarreal CF Academy learning the Spanish Methodology of the yellow submarines . He also worked as an interim with the Men's First Team where he learned and developed in the Spanish Methodology under Marcelino Garcia Toral that was appointed the clubs Manager at the time.

Nather coached his former club Al-Ahli as an assistant coach. Upon the end of the first leg of the 2017–18 season, Al-Faisaly appointed Jarrar as assistant coach. Jarrar became one of the youngest coaches in the club's history. During the 2018 season, Canadian club Mont-Royal Outremont, who played in the Première Ligue de soccer du Québec, appointed Jarrar as assistant coach. On October 2019, Jarrar was appointed assistant coach of newly-promoted Jordanian Pro League club Al Salt SC, as the assistant of Jamal Abu-Abed.

On 1 February 2021, Jarrar was appointed assistant coach of Al-Faisaly. On 8 November 2021, he was announced head coach of the academy of Major League Soccer club Whitecaps FC.

On February 6th 2023, Nather returns to the Blue Eagles and announced joining the Technical Staff re uniting with the Clubs Manager Jamal Abu Abed.

References

1982 births
Living people
Sportspeople from Amman
Jordanian footballers
Association football midfielders
Al-Hussein SC (Irbid) players
Al-Wehdat SC players
Lakeshore SC players
Concordia Stingers men's soccer players
Al-Ahli SC (Amman) players
Al-Baqa'a Club players
Jordanian Pro League players
Association football coaches
Jordanian football managers
Villarreal CF non-playing staff
Al-Ahli SC (Amman) managers
Al-Faisaly SC managers
Vancouver Whitecaps FC non-playing staff
Jordanian Pro League managers
Jordanian expatriate footballers
Jordanian expatriate sportspeople in Canada
Jordanian expatriate sportspeople in Spain
Expatriate soccer players in Canada
Expatriate football managers in Spain
Expatriate soccer managers in Canada
Jordanian expatriate football managers